Christian Dettweiler (1915 – 16 March 1995) was an innovator in the field of graphology.

Dettweiler was the author of over 40 articles and books.  He was a student of Pharmacy and in 1942 received a PhD in Botany (Plant Physiology) and was a Scientific Assistant at the Universities of Rostock and Stuttgart. From a basis in Klosinski's "Dynamic Handwriting Analysis" he developed his own graphological direction, based on psycho-analysis integrating the theories of Balint and Winnicott, Otto Kernberg and Heinz Kohut. Dr Dettweiler founded the International Association for Dynamic and Clinical Psychology of Handwriting in 1986, organising five conventions in 1986, 1988, 1990, 1992 and 1994.

German graphologists
1915 births
1995 deaths